Ingrid Schjelderup may refer to:

Ingrid Schjelderup (politician) (born 1932), Norwegian politician
Ingrid Schjelderup (footballer) (born 1987), Norwegian footballer